Leonard Likoebe (23 December 1953 – 7 November 2006) was a South African professional footballer, who played as a winger for Zulu Royals, Wits University and Kaizer Chiefs.

Kaizer Chiefs
Born in Ladybrand, he played for Maseru United and later moved to Durban to play for Zulu Royals. 
He moved to Kaizer Chiefs in 1977. 
Likoebe left Chiefs in 1982 and joined Wits University.

Style of play
His former teammate Vusi Lamola described Likoebe by saying "He was a rare striker that always scored important goals, he seldom left the field without scoring.", which meant he was very prolific.

After retirement
He joined soccer development at the SAFA centre in Klipspruit in Soweto in 1985.

Coaching career
He was appointed head coach of National First Division side Ratanang Maholoisane in 2001.

Nickname
He was named "Wagga Wagga" by fans after a champion racehorse that won the Durban July for his blistering pace.

Death
He died on 7 November 2006 at the Helen Joseph Hospital in Auckland Park after a short illness. His tombstone was made by former Kaizer Chiefs captain Jimmy Tau's memorial service company Bataung Memorials. Likoebe is survived by his widow, his daughter, two sons and a granddaughter.

Funeral
Likoebe was buried at the Avalon Cemetery on 11 November 2006.
The service was held at the Roman Catholic Church in extension 2.

References

1954 births
2006 deaths
People from Ladybrand
Bidvest Wits F.C. players
Kaizer Chiefs F.C. players
South African soccer players
South African expatriate soccer players
Expatriate footballers in Lesotho
South African expatriate sportspeople in Lesotho
Association football midfielders
Soccer players from the Free State (province)